Roulet is a French surname. Notable people with the surname include:

 Elaine Roulet (1930–2020), American Roman Catholic nun
 Lloyd Emerson Roulet (1891–1985), American mayor of Toledo, Ohio
 Lorinda de Roulet (born  1931), American philanthropist
 Vincent de Roulet ( 1925–1975), American businessman and politician

See also
 Roulet family
 Roulette

French-language surnames